UFC 178: Johnson vs. Cariaso was a mixed martial arts event held on September 27, 2014, at the  MGM Grand Garden Arena in Las Vegas, Nevada.

Background
The event was supposed to be headlined by a UFC Light Heavyweight Championship rematch between champion Jon Jones and Alexander Gustafsson. Jones won their first fight at UFC 165 by unanimous decision. Gustafsson pulled out of the bout due to a torn right meniscus and lateral collateral ligament. He was replaced by Daniel Cormier on July 23. However, on August 12, Jones was forced to pull out of the bout against Cormier citing a leg injury. The fight was rescheduled to take place at UFC 182. As a result, a Flyweight Title fight between Demetrious Johnson and Chris Cariaso was moved from UFC 177 to headline this card.

The event marked the return of former bantamweight champion Dominick Cruz, after nearly three years on the sideline, first with a coaching assignment on The Ultimate Fighter 15, then with various lengthy injury rehabilitations. He was matched up against Takeya Mizugaki.

A lightweight bout between Donald Cerrone and Khabib Nurmagomedov was briefly linked to this event. However, the pairing was cancelled after Nurmagomedov suffered a knee injury that sidelined him indefinitely.

Jorge Masvidal and Bobby Green were originally scheduled to face each other on this card. However, on August 14, the UFC announced that Green would now face Donald Cerrone and Masvidal would face James Krause.

On August 19, following his release from Bellator MMA, Eddie Alvarez signed with the UFC and made his debut against Donald Cerrone in the co-main event for the card. Bobby Green, Cerrone's earlier opponent, was booked for a future fight card against a new opponent.

Results

Bonus awards
The following fighters were awarded $50,000 bonuses:

Fight of the Night: Yoel Romero vs. Tim Kennedy
Performance of the Night: Dominick Cruz and Conor McGregor

Reported payout
The following is the reported payout to the fighters as reported to the Nevada State Athletic Commission. It does not include sponsor money and also does not include the UFC's traditional "fight night" bonuses.
 Demetrious Johnson: $183,000 (includes $54,000 win bonus) def. Chris Cariaso: $24,000
 Donald Cerrone: $126,000 (includes $63,000 win bonus) def. Eddie Alvarez: $100,000
 Conor McGregor: $150,000 (includes $75,000 win bonus) def. Dustin Poirier: $34,000
 Yoel Romero: $58,000 (includes $29,000 win bonus) def. Tim Kennedy: $70,000
 Cat Zingano: $18,000 (includes $9,000 win bonus) def. Amanda Nunes: $15,000
 Dominick Cruz: $100,000 (includes $50,000 win bonus) def. Takeya Mizugaki: $32,000
 Jorge Masvidal: $90,000 (includes $45,000 win bonus) def. James Krause: $15,000
 Stephen Thompson: $32,000 (includes $16,000 win bonus) def. Patrick Côté: $33,000
 Brian Ebersole: $42,000 (includes $21,000 win bonus) def. John Howard: $21,000
 Kevin Lee: $20,000 (includes $10,000 win bonus) def. Jon Tuck: $10,000
 Manvel Gamburyan: $50,000 (includes $25,000 win bonus) def. Cody Gibson: $10,000

See also
List of UFC events
2014 in UFC

References

Ultimate Fighting Championship events
Mixed martial arts in Las Vegas
2014 in mixed martial arts
MGM Grand Garden Arena